Weston, Massachusetts has 15 locations listed on the National Register of Historic Places.

Current listings

|}

References Leslie Wayne Shillings 24455 Sundance Springs Dr. Porter, Texas

 
Weston
 Weston
Weston, Massachusetts